The late piano sonatas of Ludwig van Beethoven usually refer to the last five piano sonatas the composer composed during his late period.
Piano Sonata No. 28 in A major, Op. 101
Piano Sonata No. 29 in B-flat major, Op. 106 "Hammerklavier"
Piano Sonata No. 30 in E major, Op. 109
Piano Sonata No. 31 in A-flat major, Op. 110
Piano Sonata No. 32 in C minor, Op. 111

Some compilations may include Piano Sonata No. 27 in E minor, Op. 90 as one of Beethoven's late piano sonatas.

Recordings
Complete cycle:
Claudio Arrau (Philips Classics)
Vladimir Ashkenazy (Decca Classics)
Wilhelm Backhaus (Decca Classics)
Daniel Barenboim (3 recordings: 2 on Deutsche Grammophon, 1 on EMI Classics)
Alfred Brendel (3 recordings: 2 on Philips Classics, reissued on Decca Classics; 1 earlier set on Vox, reissued by Brilliant Classics)
Annie Fischer (Hungaroton)
Claude Frank (Music and Arts)
Walter Gieseking
Seonuk Gim (Accentus Music)
Richard Goode (Nonesuch)
Glenn Gould (No. 28 on CBC Records, Nos. 29-32 on Sony Classical)
Gould's performances of Nos. 30-32 were previously released on Columbia Masterworks
Friedrich Gulda (3 recordings: 1 on Decca Classics; 1 on Amadeo Records, reissued on Brilliant Classics and Decca Classics; and one on Orfeo, first released in 2010)
Éric Heidsieck (EMI Classics)
Wilhelm Kempff (2 recordings on Deutsche Grammophon)
Stephen Kovacevich (EMI Classics)
Christian Leotta (ATMA Classique)
Igor Levit (Sony Classics)
Paul Lewis (Harmonia Mundi)
Yves Nat (EMI classics)
Kun-Woo Paik (Decca Classics)
Maurizio Pollini (Deutsche Grammophon)
Sviatoslav Richter (various performances of each sonata on varying labels)
Bernard Roberts (Nimbus)
Charles Rosen (CBS, reissued on CD Sony Classics)
András Schiff (ECM Records)
Artur Schnabel (EMI Classics) 
Peter Serkin (Musical Concepts)
Rudolf Serkin (Sony Classical)
Solomon (EMI Classics)
Mitsuko Uchida (Philips Classics)

Partial cycle (3 or more):
Christoph Eschenbach (Nos. 29-32 on EMI Classics)
Emil Gilels (Nos. 28-31 on Deutsche Grammophon)

Of the five sonatas, the last one (in C minor) is the most often recorded, as heard in interpretations by Julius Katchen, Arturo Benedetti Michelangeli, Mikhail Pletnev, Ivo Pogorelić, and Anatol Ugorski.

See also
 Piano sonatas (Beethoven)
 Diabelli Variations, another piano work composed during Beethoven's late period
 Bagatelles Op. 119 & Op. 126
 Schubert's last sonatas

Piano sonatas by Ludwig van Beethoven